Paolo Marostica is an Italian lightweight rower. He won a gold medal at the 1985 World Rowing Championships in Hazewinkel with the lightweight men's eight.

References

Year of birth missing (living people)
Italian male rowers
World Rowing Championships medalists for Italy
Living people